Plurisperma is a genus of fungi in the family Verrucariaceae; according to the 2007 Outline of Ascomycota, the placement in this family is uncertain. A monotypic genus, it contains the single species Plurisperma dalbergiae. The family Verrucariaceae is somewhat toxic to mammals due to the presence of vulpinic acid.

References

External links
Index Fungorum

Verrucariales
Lichen genera
Monotypic Ascomycota genera
Taxa described in 1970